Ekron is a home rule-class city in Meade County, Kentucky, United States. The population was 170 at the 2000 census.

Geography
Ekron is located at  (37.930819, -86.177999).

History
Ekron was laid out on land donated by a Dr. Roberts, whose wife named the town after the biblical city Ekron. It was formally incorporated by act of the state assembly in 1906.

Demographics

As of the census of 2000, there were 170 people, 65 households, and 44 families residing in the city. The racial makeup of the city was 88.24% White, 1.76% African American, 0.59% Native American, 1.76% Asian, 2.94% from other races, and 4.71% from two or more races. Hispanic or Latino of any race were 2.94% of the population.

There were 65 households, out of which 29.2% had children under the age of 18 living with them, 52.3% were married couples living together, 13.8% had a female householder with no husband present, and 30.8% were non-families. 27.7% of all households were made up of individuals, and 15.4% had someone living alone who was 65 years of age or older. The average household size was 2.62 and the average family size was 3.29.

The age distribution was 27.1% under the age of 18, 5.9% from 18 to 24, 29.4% from 25 to 44, 24.7% from 45 to 64, and 12.9% who were 65 years of age or older. The median age was 37 years. For every 100 females, there were 88.9 males. For every 100 females age 18 and over, there were 85.1 males.

The median income for a household in the city was $28,125, and the median income for a family was $36,563. Males had a median income of $16,250 versus $20,000 for females. The per capita income for the city was $11,300. About 12.2% of families and 17.0% of the population were below the poverty line, including 10.6% of those under the age of eighteen and 9.1% of those 65 or over.

Notable people

 Pee Wee Reese, Baseball Hall of Famer
 Archie Romines, former State Representative

References

Cities in Kentucky
Cities in Meade County, Kentucky
Louisville metropolitan area
Populated places established in 1906
1906 establishments in Kentucky